Penicillium chalybeum is a fungus species of the genus of Penicillium which was isolated from dried fish in Sri Lanka discovered in the 1980's.

See also
List of Penicillium species

References

Further reading

 

chalybeum
Fungi described in 1985